State Route 249 (SR 249) is a north–south secondary state highway located in Middle Tennessee. The route is located entirely In Cheatham County.

Route description
SR 249 is one of three state routes in Tennessee that begins and ends with an interchange along a freeway or interstate. The others being SR 385 and SR 109. any type. Its southern and northern termini are with I-40 and I-24 in the southern and northern ends of the county, respectively. 

SR 249 begins in Kingston Springs at the Exit 188 interchange of I-40. It continues northward through Pegram to Ashland City, then it turns northeast to end at I-24’s exit 31 interchange in northeastern Cheatham County. 

Concurrencies involved in this route includes US 70 (SR 1) in Pegram, SR 49 through Ashland City, and SR 12 in downtown Ashland City.

Major intersections

References 
 

249 
249